SS Daniel Webster (MC contract 211) was a Liberty ship built in the United States during World War II.

Named after Daniel Webster, an American statesman, the ship was laid down by South Portland Shipbuilding Corporation in South Portland, Maine, at their West Yard on 1 November 1942, then launched on 28 January 1943. The ship was completed 10 February 1943 and delivered to the War Shipping Administration (WSA) for operation by Sprague Steamship Company under a WSA agreement the same day.

On 10 January 1944, she was torpedoed in the Mediterranean Sea off Oran, French Algeria in an air attack on convoy KMS 37 while en route from Gibraltar to Augusta and Naples. The ship was beached and declared a total constructive loss.  The ship was sold for scrapping in a group of forty hulks on 19 December 1947 to Venturi Salvattigi Recuperi e Impresse Marrittime Societta per Azione of Genoa.

References

External links
U.S. Maritime Service Veterans 

Liberty ships
Ships built in Portland, Maine
1943 ships
Maritime incidents in January 1944
World War II shipwrecks in the Mediterranean Sea
Ships sunk by German aircraft
Cargo ships sunk by aircraft